The Río Olimar River is a river in the Treinta y Tres Department of Uruguay.

Course
The river rises as a small stream in the hills of Cuchilla Grande in western Treinta y Tres Department, just southwest of Santa Clara de Olimar. Heading southeasterly, it collects the smaller streams, the most important of which are the Brazo de la Yeguada, Olimar Chico River (Small Olimar), and Arroyo Yerbal Grande. Other creeks flowing into the Olimar Grande are the Lagarto, Avestruz and Corrales.

The city of Treinta y Tres, capital of the department, appears almost surrounded by the Olimar River and its affluent, the Great Yerbal stream. The two margins of the river are covered with thick native mount. At the southwest limits of the city, three bridges cross the river. These small distances separating the three bridges create a beautiful view often depicted in photos of the Treinta y Tres.

Folklore and art
Besides these geographic characteristics, the Olimar river has an important historical and artistic meaning for the region and the country. An Uruguayan quote about it is "the river that sings more", because its surroundings have been inspiration of various local artists, mainly musicians and poets. Annually a folk music and dance festival takes place on its banks by the city of Treinta y Tres, which gathers participation and audience from all over Uruguay as well as from abroad.

See also
List of rivers of Uruguay

References
Rand McNally, The New International Atlas, 1993.
 GEOnet Names Server

Rivers of Uruguay
Rivers of Treinta y Tres Department